The Municipality of Tolmin is a municipality in northwestern Slovenia. Its seat and largest settlement is Tolmin.

History

In ancient times the area was inhabited by the Illyrians and then by the Romans. In the 6th century the Slavs, ancestors of present-day Slovenes, settled the area.

Until 1420 it belonged to the Patriarchate of Aquileia, when it was acquired by the Republic of Venice. In 1514 it became a possession of the Habsburgs, who gave it as fief to the Coronini-Cronberg family. Medieval documents testify to a long series of uprisings, culminating in the Tolmin peasant revolt of 1713. That particular insurgence spread from Tolmin County to the Vipava Valley, Karst, and Brda, and further on to northern Istria. The uprising was mercilessly crushed by the imperial army and its eleven leaders were beheaded.

In the 16th century, the area became part of the County of Gorizia and Gradisca. During the World War I, Tolmin served as a base for the victorious breach of the Soča/Isonzo Front. Occupied by Italian troops at the end of 1918, it was part of the Kingdom of Italy between 1918 and 1943 (nominally to 1947) as a commune of the Province of Gorizia (as Tolmino), except during the period between 1924 and 1927, when the Province of Gorizia was abolished and annexed to the Province of Udine. and between 1943 and 1945 of the Nazi German Operational Zone Adriatic Coast. In 1945 it was liberated by the Yugoslav Partisans and in 1947 it was officially annexed to Yugoslavia. Since then, it has been an integral part of Slovenia.

Geography
The Tolmin area includes the Tolminka and Zadlaščica basins at the entrance to Triglav National Park, which are also its lowest point. A special feature of the Tolminka Basins is a thermal spring at the end of the path. The region also boasts several record-holding waterfalls (Brinta Falls,  and Gregorčič Falls) and several other smaller waterfalls hidden in the ravines of Cold Creek, Godiča Creek, Pščak Creek, and Sopotnica Creek.

Settlements

In addition to the municipal seat of Tolmin, the municipality also includes the following settlements:

Bača pri Modreju
Bača pri Podbrdu
Bukovski Vrh
Čadrg
Čiginj
Daber
Dolenja Trebuša
Dolgi Laz
Dolje
Drobočnik
Gabrje
Gorenja Trebuša
Gorenji Log
Gorski Vrh
Grahovo ob Bači
Grant
Grudnica
Hudajužna
Idrija pri Bači
Kal
Kamno
Kanalski Lom
Klavže
Kneške Ravne
Kneža
Koritnica
Kozaršče
Kozmerice
Kuk
Lisec
Ljubinj
Logaršče
Loje
Modrej
Modrejce
Most na Soči
Obloke
Pečine
Petrovo Brdo
Podbrdo
Podmelec
Polje
Poljubinj
Ponikve
Porezen
Postaja
Prapetno
Prapetno Brdo
Roče
Rut
Sela nad Podmelcem
Sela pri Volčah
Selce
Selišče
Šentviška Gora
Slap ob Idrijci
Stopnik
Stržišče
Temljine
Tolminske Ravne
Tolminski Lom
Trtnik
Volarje
Volčanski Ruti
Volče
Žabče
Zadlaz–Čadrg
Zadlaz–Žabče
Zakraj
Zatolmin
Znojile

Culture
Tolmin has been the venue for the Metaldays heavy metal festival, Punk Rock Holiday, and Soča Reggae Riversplash festival.

Politics
The Municipality of Tolmin is governed by a mayor elected every four years by popular vote, and a municipal council of 22 members. The local political scene is relatively diversified, with no prevalence of a particular party, although the conservative New Slovenia and Slovenian People's Party tend to receive a higher proportion of votes than their national average. Traditionally, the left-wing and liberal parties have been stronger in the town center, whereas the countryside tends to favor conservative parties. In national politics, the Tolmin electoral district has highly favored the conservative Slovenian Democratic Party, but this is largely due to the prevalence of this party in the other two municipalities forming the district, (Bovec and Kobarid).

References

External links

Municipality of Tolmin on Geopedia

 
Tolmin
1994 establishments in Slovenia